Proskinitos is a form of a Greek folk dance from Macedonia, Greece.

See also
 Music of Greece
 Greek dances

References

 Προσκυνητός - Musipedia

Greek dances